Antigovernment may refer to:

 Opposition (politics), a party with views opposing the current government
 Political dissent, opposition to the politics of the governing body
 Sedition, incitement of discontent to a lawful governing body
 Anti-statism, a political philosophy opposing state interference
 Anarchism, a political philosophy advocating the abolition of rulers